The Abandoned Pennsylvania Turnpike is the common name of a  stretch of the Pennsylvania Turnpike that was bypassed in 1968 when a modern stretch opened to ease traffic congestion in the tunnels. In this case, the Sideling Hill Tunnel and Rays Hill Tunnel were bypassed, as was one of the Turnpike's travel plazas. The bypass is located just east of the heavily congested Breezewood interchange for Interstate 70 (I-70) eastbound at what is now I-76 exit 161. The section of the turnpike was at one time part of the South Pennsylvania Railroad.

History

Opening and realignment 

When the Pennsylvania Turnpike opened in 1940, it was known as the "Tunnel Highway" because it traversed seven tunnels: from east to west, Blue Mountain, Kittatinny Mountain, Tuscarora Mountain, Sideling Hill, Rays Hill, Allegheny Mountain, and Laurel Hill. There was one tunnel through each mountain, and the highway was reduced to a single lane in each direction through each tunnel. These tunnels were originally built as part of the South Pennsylvania Railroad. The Quemahoning, Negro Mountain, and original Allegheny Mountain tunnels were bypassed during the original construction of the turnpike.

By the late 1950s, the turnpike was so heavily used that traffic congestion demanded expansion because bottlenecks at the two-lane tunnels on the Pennsylvania Turnpike became a major problem. Traffic jams formed at each tunnel, especially during the summer. The Pennsylvania Turnpike Commission (PTC) conducted studies on either expanding or bypassing the tunnels. Following the studies, the PTC decided to construct new tubes at four of the tunnels and bypass the remaining three. The Sideling Hill and Rays Hill tunnels were bypassed by a  new highway, as was the Cove Valley Travel Plaza, which was located on the westbound side of the eastern portal of the Sideling Hill Tunnel. Instead, a new Sideling Hill Travel Plaza was built to cater for travelers in both directions of the highway. The turnpike bypass of Rays Hill and Sideling Hill tunnels opened to traffic on November 26, 1968.

Abandonment 

Today, the Abandoned Pennsylvania Turnpike, as it is commonly known, is a popular tourist attraction. The PTC sold most of the property to the Southern Alleghenies Conservancy (SAC) for $1 in 2001. The property is managed by Friends of the Pike 2 Bike, a coalition of non-profit groups (including the SAC) to eventually convert the stretch into a bike trail. The property is officially closed to the public, and no motor vehicles are allowed on the property, but bicycle riders are free to use it at their own risk. The trail requires helmets and lights. Because this stretch sits on parts of the former right-of-way of the South Pennsylvania Railroad that was never completed but later formed the basis of the mainline turnpike, this makes the Pike2Bike unofficially a rail trail.

The tunnel's entrances have deteriorated due to vandalism, and their signboards were taken sometime between 1981 and 1999. However, tunnel structure is still sound despite not having been maintained for decades.

A business plan and feasibility study was completed by Gannett Fleming in 2005. It proposed various ideas to make the trail as accessible as possible for cyclists, hikers, inline skaters, and equestrians.

, the trail is in the process of changing ownership to Bedford County. This is in response to the Pennsylvania Department of Conservation and Natural Resources' need for a governmental body to own the trail before it can give out grants. The Friends of the Pike 2 Bike will continue to run and oversee the trail.

Later uses 

In the early 1970s, the emission levels of unleaded gasoline were tested in Rays Hill Tunnel. A Plymouth Satellite was used as the test vehicle. The PTC and PennDOT used the highway to train maintenance workers, as well as for testing of rumble strips.

There have also been numerous military uses for the highway; the tunnels were considered as a storage area for weapons, as was the open highway for aircraft. The military also used the highway for training soldiers for Iraq in the early 2000s, even after the highway was sold to the SAC.

The site of the former Cove Valley Travel Plaza was used as a shooting range for the Pennsylvania State Police. Since the SAC bought the property, the site has not been used as a shooting range, although warning signs are still posted in the area.

In 2008 the highway was used for the filming of the Dimension Films movie The Road starring Viggo Mortensen. The studios mildly restored the exterior of the eastern portal of the Ray's Hill Tunnel when it was used for filming.

Access 

In 2005, the PTC restricted access to the abandoned turnpike by demolishing an overpass over U.S. Route 30 (US 30) in Breezewood and an overpass on Pump Station Road near the site of the old Cove Valley Travel Plaza. The demolition of the overpasses removed the liability and expense of repairing the aging bridges, marked the property lines between the public and the PTC-owned sections of the property, and prevented motorized vehicles from easily entering the abandoned turnpike.

The original plans for the removal included an access road, but somewhere along the way, it was removed and not known to Pike 2 Bike officials until it was too late. , the Friends of the Pike 2 Bike are seeking to obtain grants that will allow the building of an access road and to rebuild on it the last remaining original toll booth, which was obtained in 2006. The toll booth will be used to collect a parking donation that will be used to pay for maintenance. An access road was built in the late 2000s on the PTC-owned side of the former Pump Station Road overpass, making the  section still owned by the PTC a de facto access road to the active turnpike in itself; however, like other access roads along the turnpike, it is off-limits to the public and is only used by the PTC or Pennsylvania State Police.

There are three access points to the public section of the abandoned highway:
 The intersection of Tannery Road and US 30 is just east of the Breezewood interchange where I-70, US-30, and I-76 meet. It sits near the western end of the abandoned turnpike, which can be reached by climbing a small hill. Parking is available in front of the orange snow fence at the bottom of the hill. Rays Hill Tunnel lies about two miles east of this point.
 A parking lot exists on the trail at the eastern end of the turnpike off Pump Station Road north of US 30; the entrance is a service road just south of where a turnpike overpass was removed in 2005. This access point lies near the site of the former Cove Valley Travel Plaza and about one mile east of the Sideling Hill Tunnel.
 A forest service path called Oregon Road leaves US Route 30 at that highway's intersection with Pennsylvania Route 915 about a mile east of the crest of Ray's Hill. Oregon Road runs north from US Route 30 for several hundred feet, then bears to the right after it passes under the Pennsylvania Turnpike (I-76). The road to the left is a privately owned driveway leading to Valley-Hi. The road to the right is Oregon Road, which runs for several miles of dirt and gravel road before reconnecting with PA 915 just south of Wells Tannery. Oregon Road runs parallel and adjacent to the abandoned highway for much of its length, and several clearings in the forest allow for parking and access to the road. These access points lie between the two tunnels: Rays Hill is about three miles west and Sideling Hill is about two miles east.

Other tunnel bypasses 

The Abandoned Turnpike is perhaps the best-known of tunnel bypasses on toll roads. Among the other bypassed tunnels:
 The Laurel Hill Tunnel, which preceded the Sideling Hill and Rays Hill bypass by four years.
 The Memorial Tunnel on the West Virginia Turnpike was bypassed in 1987 to complete upgrading that highway to Interstate standards. Unlike the Pennsylvania Turnpike, the West Virginia Turnpike was built two lanes for its entire length, and needed an additional two lanes in order to get the I-77 and I-64 designations.
 The PTC considered bypassing the Lehigh Tunnel on the Northeast Extension before ultimately deciding on twinning the tunnel. Cost for the bypass and unnecessary added mileage to the highway were deciding factors.
 The PTC has been considering bypassing the deteriorating Allegheny Mountain Tunnel to alleviate traffic congestion. Boring a third tunnel is also being considered. Planning resumed in 2014.

See also

References

External links 

 Old PA Pike Website
 Pike 2 Bike
 Abandoned Turnpike
 Solomons Island Cycling Abandoned Pennsylvania Turnpike Photos

Demolished highways in the United States
Historic trails and roads in Pennsylvania
Parks in Bedford County, Pennsylvania
Parks in Fulton County, Pennsylvania
Pennsylvania Turnpike Commission
Protected areas of Bedford County, Pennsylvania
Protected areas of Fulton County, Pennsylvania